Georgius Parchich (1658–1703) was a Roman Catholic prelate who served as Bishop of Nona (1690–1703).

Biography
Georgius Parchich was born in Sebenico (Šibenik), Republic of Venice (now Croatia) on 28 April 1658.

On 8 May 1690, he was appointed during the papacy of Pope Alexander VIII as Bishop of Nona. On 4 June 1690, he was consecrated bishop by Fabrizio Spada, Cardinal-Priest of San Crisogono with Francesco Martelli, titular Archbishop of Corinthus, and Victor Augustinus Ripa, Bishop of Vercelli, serving as co-consecrators. During his office, he informed Rome on the large community of Orthodox in his bishopric, and sought for Rome to send missionaries to Catholicise (Uniatise) them. He called the inhabitants of Budin (a former settlement in Posedarje area) the "worst Schismatic [Orthodox] people".

When notable hajduk Ilija Janković Mitrović died in 1692, Parchich came to his funeral at Islam Grčki, despite the fact that Mitrović was Orthodox and not Catholic. The local Serbian Orthodox priest forbade Parchich to carry out a requiem, of which he informed the Congregation of Propaganda on 8 July 1692.

In his April 1693 report, Parchich registered 5,486 Roman Catholics and 7,363 Orthodox people in the territory of the bishopric of Nin. The Catholics had 21 priests while the Orthodox had 15. Parchich actively worked on the Uniatisation of Orthodox Serbs, and is known to have converted villages, such as that of Poličnik, "from Schismatic mistakes".

He served as Bishop of Nona until his death in February 1703. He was styled "Eminentiarum Vestrarum Humillimus Addictissimus, et Obseqentissimus Servus Georgius Parchich, Episcopus Nonensis".

References

References 
 
  

17th-century Roman Catholic bishops in Croatia
18th-century Roman Catholic bishops in Croatia
Bishops appointed by Pope Alexander VIII
1658 births
1703 deaths
People from Šibenik
Catholicisation
History of the Serbs of Croatia
Venetian period in the history of Croatia
Croatian bishops
18th-century Roman Catholic bishops in the Holy Roman Empire